Emily Henderson is a New Zealand politician and Member of Parliament in the House of Representatives for the Labour Party.

Biography
Henderson has lived in Whangārei since the age of seven. She attended Kaurihohore Primary, Whangarei Intermediate and Tikipunga High School. She subsequently completed a law degree at the University of Auckland and a PhD at the University of Cambridge. Before becoming a Member of Parliament in 2020, she worked as a consultant at the law firm Henderson Reeves, which was co-founded by her father. Her legal area of specialty is the Family Court.

Political career

She was selected as Labour's candidate for the  election. The preliminary results released after the election night count placed her 164 votes behind the incumbent MP, National's Shane Reti. The closeness of the initial figures meant that Henderson attended induction events for new MPs. When the final results were released after the counting of special votes, Henderson had overtaken Reti to win the seat by 431 votes, and hence became a Member of Parliament.

In her first term, Henderson was appointed as a member of the Justice Committee and the Social Services and Community Committee. Henderson chaired a sub-committee of the Conversion Practices Prohibition Legislation and voted in favour of the bill.

She resigned from parliament on the 17th of March 2023 effective at the 2023 election.

Legal career
Henderson, a former crown prosecutor, was awarded a fellowship from the New Zealand Law Foundation in 2012 to research the reform of cross examination. The resulting paper, "Expert witnesses under examination in the New Zealand criminal and family courts", was published in March 2013.

References

Living people
New Zealand Labour Party MPs
Members of the New Zealand House of Representatives
New Zealand MPs for North Island electorates
Women members of the New Zealand House of Representatives
University of Auckland alumni
Candidates in the 2020 New Zealand general election
New Zealand women lawyers
Year of birth missing (living people)